Khalaf Ali Alkhalaf  (Arabic: خلف علي الخلف); born 10 November 1969 in Raqqa, is a poet and writer. He holds Swedish nationality. He lived in Saudi Arabia from 1993 until 2001, then in the same year he moved to Greece and stayed there until the summer of 2002. He went back to Syria and returned to Saudi Arabia again. In the spring of 2008, he left Saudi Arabia, went to Egypt and stayed in Alexandria.

Biography 

His first book appeared in 2004 (N of Shepherds). At the end of 2005, Khalaf founded Jidar website. It was an independent cultural platform for freethinking and supporting beginning and independent writers. It had been rated as the first among the Syrian culture websites and had high ranking. The Syrian government blocked the website later. Alkhalaf had been called for investigation by the Syrian Intelligence authorities almost every time he published one of his works. The last investigation call Alkhalaf received by them was in the summer of 2007.

Later that year Alkhalaf travelled to Saudi Arabia, where he continued writing articles criticizing the Syrian regime and calling for a democratic alternative. He wrote an article under the title 'A public Self-Declaration to the Syrian Security Authorities' and ever since then he couldn't come back to Syria until 2013, when Raqqa was not under Assad regime any more.

In September 2008 Alkhalaf, together with other Arab writers (Hamed Bin Aqeel and Suzan Khawatmi), founded 'Jidar for culture and publishing'. It was a non-profit publishing house. In this time Jidar began publishing many books, especially those criticizing the Assad regime and diaries of a Syrian prisoner.

Regularly he publishes some of his work in Elaph electronic newspaper. Since 2003 in addition on other websites and blogs like Jidar and Ahewar. He has also published in many Arabic newspapers.
Alkhalaf has been awarded at the Fujairah International Monodrama Festival competition in 2009. He won the second prize by writing the script of a monodrama called 'Gilgamesh Wears Tennis Shoes'.

Most of his articles are published on Elaph electronic newspaper since 2003. In the years that follow, he has been publishing in addition on other newssites, newspapers and Arab magazines

Khalaf studied Economics at the University of Aleppo. Also, he studied International Relations at Malmö University, Content Producer at Malmö Yrkeshögskola, Digital Humanities at Kalmar University and Master program in Journalism at Södertörn University

Bibliography 
 2004 N of Shepherds – poetry 
 2007 Al Tanzeel – poetry
 2008 Kouhl of Desire – poetry
 2008 Stranger's Howling, a tale never been knocked by a bird – poetry
 2009 Poems on a Single Shoe – poetry
 2010 Gilgamesh Wears Tennis Shoes – Monodrama
 2010 About the Country Without Hope: Al Assad Jr...His kingdom and his opposition – Political articles
 2011 Black and White Votes – Dialogues with writers
 2012 Two Facts and One Actor – Monodrama
 2013 Najla Bah and Qaradawi are Two Sides of the Same Coin – Political articles
 2015 Diaries of Present Wartime – poetry
 2016 Diaries of Present Wartime – poetry English translation
 2017 I am from Islamic State - Monodrama
 2018 Diaries of Present Wartime - poetry German translation
 2019 It is All ِِAbout Senses - poetry

Awards 
 Second prize award of Ali Al-Safi poetry 2005 in Kuwait for his poem: 'My Lord! My Black Unmatched to Tears; Lord' 'مولاي.. يا أسوداً لايضاهى بدمع''.
 At the Fujairah International Monodrama Festival competition in 2009. Second prize for his script of a monodrama called 'Gilgamesh Wears Tennis Shoes'.

Political and cultural activities 
Before the Syrian revolution began, Alkhalaf was known for his cultural activities and as a critical writer against the Assad regime. Alkhalaf began his political activity during the Arab Spring, which resulted in the Syrian Revolution, it began on 15 March 2011 when he was in Egypt. He participated in the organization of the first demonstration in front of the Syrian embassy in Cairo that day, demanding to topple the regime, they were assaulted by the embassy elements. In addition to his involvement in organizing protests in front of the embassy, he began covering the events of the Syrian revolution from Egypt through Arabic satellite channels, newspapers and websites. He became participated with a group of activists in the establishment of the 'Coalition of Democratic Voices', which is the first Syrian political rally during the revolution. The rally didn't last long.

Alkhalaf was one of the main organizers of the Syria Conference for Change which took place in the Turkish city of Antalya between 31–3 May June 2011 in order to support the Syrian revolution and the search for solutions to save Syria from tyranny and put it on the path of freedom and dignity. This is considered as the first extended conference in the history of the Syrian opposition.

Since the beginning of the Syrian revolution, Alkhalaf was calling for the continuation of nonviolent resistance and peaceful protests. from the first uprising he was against arming the revolution. In his opinion such would destroy the country: "Arming the uprising will lead us to the whirlpool of civil war, and using force will put us in the court of the regime in which he fully masters playing there". He wrote many articles and studies that explain why civil resistance works.

In April 2012, Alkhalaf participated with more than 60 Syrian political and cultural figures in establishing the 'Syrian Democratic Platform'. He was elected as a member of the leadership, and was re-elected in the first conference of the SDP which was in Cairo in ِApril 2012, SPD was a cultural gathering: intellectually politically calling for democratic change in Syria. The platform did not last long due to the direction of the militarization of the revolution.

At the end of 2012 Alkhalaf participated with a group of Syrian activists in establishing 'our-right movement': Haquna. It was a youth movement of civil protest, calling for change through peaceful means. It had been an active movement in Raqqa after becoming outside the regime's control. Haquna movement lead many activities and nonviolent resistance against the Islamic extremist groups that occupied the city. Alkhalaf was a trainer for Haquna's members on nonviolent action.

By nonviolent resistance Haquna has faced Jabhat Al Nusra, a Syrian branch of Al-Qaeda, Ahrar ash-Sham, as well as ISIS after their killing of 3 Syrians at the main square in Raqqa city. Haquna organized a sit-in for 3 days at same square, then ISIS arrested members of Haquna, still one of them Still unaccounted for.

In May 2013 he participated in the preparatory conference for the establishment of the Syrians Democratic Union. He was a member of the Preparatory Committee for the First Conference, which was held in Istanbul in September 2013.

Alkhalaf co-founded the Syrian Writers Association, which was established in 2012 as an alternative to the regime controlled Arab Writers Union.

Alkhalaf co-founded the Syrian Journalists Association in February 2013, wrote their statutes and became a member of the Membership Committee.

Alkhalaf co-founded the Association of Syrian Writers and Journalists in December 2017 in Malmo, wrote its rules of procedure and became its chairman.

See also 
Syrian Civil War

References

Syrian poets
Syrian bloggers
Syrian dissidents
1969 births
Living people
Syrian democracy activists
People of the Syrian civil war
Malmö University alumni
Södertörn University alumni